KYRM (91.9 FM) is a radio station broadcasting a Spanish Religious format. Licensed to Yuma, Arizona, United States, it serves the Yuma area.  The station is owned by World Radio Network, Inc..

External links
 
 
 
 

YRM
YRM